Miloš Bogunović (born 10 June 1985) is a Serbian professional footballer who plays as a forward.

Club career

Early career
After spending his development years at local clubs Zemun and Teleoptik, Bogunović made his senior debuts with Srem Jakovo in the Serbian League Belgrade in 2003. He was subsequently transferred to top-flight side Rad in the 2006 winter transfer window. However, the club suffered relegation to the second tier at the end of the season. In the following season, Bogunović was the team's third-highest scorer with eight league goals, behind Filip Đorđević (16) and Brana Ilić (9), as Rad failed to earn promotion back after losing in the playoffs to BSK Borča. The club eventually won promotion in 2008, after defeating Smederevo in the final elimination round. With 13 league goals, Bogunović finished the season as the club's top scorer ahead of the likes of Brana Ilić (6) and Vladimir Jovančić (4).

Partizan
On 18 June 2008, Bogunović moved to Partizan, signing a four-year deal. He made his competitive debut for the club in the first leg of the 2008–09 UEFA Champions League second qualifying round, on 29 July 2008, scoring the opener in a 1–1 draw away at Inter Baku. On 13 August 2008, Bogunović scored a 14th-minute goal in the third qualifying round first leg versus Fenerbahçe, to give his team a 2–0 lead. He then scored an amazing long distance goal, which was eventually disallowed due to offside. The game eventually ended in a 2–2 draw. On 18 September 2008, Bogunović scored the winning goal in a 2–1 away victory over Timișoara in the first leg of the 2008–09 UEFA Cup first round. He also helped the club defend the domestic double that season.

In January 2010, Bogunović moved to Spain and joined Segunda División side Cádiz, on a six-month loan deal. He made his official debut for the club in a league game against Albacete on 7 March 2010, which Cádiz won 4–3. Until the end of the season, Bogunović made just two more appearances, as the club was relegated to Segunda División B.

After returning from loan, Bogunović helped Partizan qualify for the 2010–11 UEFA Champions League group stage, but failed to make his debut in the main competition. He also collected his second double at the end of the season.

Later career
In July 2011, Bogunović signed a two-year contract with SuperLiga newcomers Novi Pazar. He spent two seasons at the club, making 48 league appearances and scoring six goals. In the summer of 2013, Bogunović moved abroad for the second time and joined Thai club Bangkok United.

In early 2015, Bogunović returned to his country and joined SuperLiga club Donji Srem. He switched to fellow top-tier side Spartak Subotica in August of the same year.

International career
Bogunović made his international debut for Serbia in a 0–1 friendly loss against Poland on 14 December 2008.

Statistics

Honours
Partizan
 Serbian SuperLiga: 2008–09, 2010–11
 Serbian Cup: 2008–09, 2010–11
Teleoptik
 Serbian League Belgrade: 2016–17
Žarkovo
 Serbian League Belgrade: 2017–18

References

External links
 
 
 

Association football forwards
Milos Bogunovic
Cádiz CF players
Expatriate footballers in Spain
Expatriate footballers in Thailand
First League of Serbia and Montenegro players
FK Donji Srem players
FK Novi Pazar players
FK Partizan players
FK Rad players
FK Spartak Subotica players
FK Srem Jakovo players
FK Teleoptik players
Footballers from Belgrade
OFK Žarkovo players
Segunda División players
Serbia and Montenegro footballers
Serbia international footballers
Serbian expatriate footballers
Serbian expatriate sportspeople in Spain
Serbian expatriate sportspeople in Thailand
Serbian First League players
Serbian footballers
Serbian SuperLiga players
Milos Bogunovic
1985 births
Living people